Puran  (Bhanja Puran or Tamudia Puran) is caste group of East India. They are considered as OBC and they are primarily inhabitants of Odisha, West Bengal and Jharkhand.

References

Sources 

Ethnic groups in India